The Tunisian Ministry of the Interior is a government ministry of Tunisia, responsible mainly for internal affairs.

2011 communiqué
In a communiqué released on Monday 7 March 2011, the Tunisian Ministry of the Interior said it has already started implementing the following measures:
Breaking definitely with any "political police" functions whether at the level of structure, mission or practices.
Removing the State Security Division.
Reasserting the commitment of the Interior Ministry to enforce the law and respect freedoms and civil rights.

In this communiqué the Interior Ministry said all these practical measures are in harmony with the values of the revolution and are designed to comply with the law, in theory and practice, in materialisation of the climate of confidence and transparency in the relationship between security services and the citizens. These measures, adds the communiqué, were also taken to overcome the deficiencies noted under the former regime. They are also part of the re-organisation of the Home Security structures by drawing inspiration on regulations in force in democratic States as well as the expertise and experiences of these countries.

These measures and decisions, said the communiqué, are part of the new approach of the Interior Ministry's competences and the will to continue the action already started to contribute to achieving the attributes of democracy, dignity and freedom.

USGN
The National Guard Special Unit (USGN) (French: Unite Speciale' Garde Nationale) is a Tunisian counter-terrorism unit created in the 1980s and based in Hammamet. It appears to be part of the National Guard of Tunisia, itself part of the Ministry of the Interior (Tunisia).

BAT
The Anti-terrorist Brigade (فرقة مجابهة الارهاب) or BAT, whose members are referred to as « black tigers », is the unit of the Tunisian national police specialized in paramilitary operations during particularly serious events.
According to OTAN's definition, the BAT is a special force. Its role notably includes taking action during crisis situations, such as hostage-taking on boats, aircraft, in cities etc, arresting high-risk criminals, and contributing to the fight against terrorism.
The BAT is based in Tunis, at the headquarters of the intervention units at the Bouchoucha barracks, with the training and education centre located in Béjal. Joining the unit comes along with highly strict requirements, especially in terms of physical, medical, mental and psychotechnical fitness; it recruits the best people of the national police. Its motto is "Speed. Force. Effectivity".

The unit comprises 50 men divided into three sections (two operational, one headquarters). The USGN is reinforced by the National Guard Commando Company (GCGN) (French: Groupment de Commando de la Garde Nationale).

BNE
La Brigade nationale de détection et de neutralisation d'explosifs (الفوج الوطني للمتفجرات ) or BNE is a Tunisian brigade specialising in explosives and bomb disposal. It also contributes to the fight against terrorism. The BNE is based in the headquarters of the intervention units in Bouchoucha barracks (Tunis) but it is also present in the country's major cities and at all border crossings. Access to the unit requires very strict criteria, particularly with regard to physical fitness, medical, psychological and psychotechnical tests; it recruits from the best elements of the national police and specialists in chemistry and electronics. The agents have a double capacity: that of participating in armed interventions and that of artificers.

List of ministers
1955–1956: Mongi Slim
1956–1965: Taïeb Mhiri
1965–1969: Beji Caid Essebsi
1969–1970: Hédi Khefacha
1970–1971: Ahmed Mestiri
1971: Hedi Amara Nouira
1971–1973: Hédi Khefacha
1973–1977: Tahar Belkhodja
1977: Abdallah Farhat
1977–1979: Dhaoui Hannablia
1979–1980: Othman Kechrid
1980–1984: Driss Guiga
1984–1986: Mohammed Mzali
1986–1987: Zine El Abidine Ben Ali
1987–1988: Habib Ammar
1988–1990: Chédli Neffati
1990–1991: Abdelhamid Escheikh
1991–1995: Abdallah Kallel
1995–1997: Mohamed Jegham
1997: Mohamed Ben Rejeb
1997–1999: Ali Chaouch
1999–2001: Abdallah Kallel
2001–2002: Abdallah Kaâbi
2002–2004: Hédi M'henni
2004–2011: Rafiq Belhaj Kacem
2011: Ahmed Friaa
2011: Farhat Rajhi
2011: Habib Essid
2011–2013: Ali Laarayedh
2013–2015: Lotfi Ben Jeddou
2015–2016: Mohamed Najem Gharsalli
2016–2017: Hédi Majdoub
2017–2018: Lotfi Brahem
2018–2020: Hichem Fourati
2020: Hichem Mechichi
2020–2021: Taoufik Charfeddine
2021: Hichem Mechichi
2021: Ridha Gharsallaoui
2021-2023: Taoufik Charfeddine

References

Internal affairs
Counterterrorism
Tunisia
Interior ministers of Tunisia